San Vicente del Caguán  is a town and municipality in Amazonian Caquetá Department, southern Colombia.

Religion 
Its Marian Catedral Nuestra Señora de las Mercedes (dedicated to the Virgin of Mercy) is the cathedral episcopal see of the Roman Catholic Diocese of San Vicente del Caguán.

History 
Between 1998 and 2002, San Vicente del Caguán was the center of the demilitarized zone (DMZ), which was created as a safe haven for the revolutionary FARC rebels. Two days after the peace talks were ended, Ingrid Betancourt was kidnapped while entering the former DMZ.

External links 
 
  San Vicente del Caguán official website

Municipalities of Caquetá Department